Olosega is a village and the capital of Olosega in Ofu-Olosega in American Samoa. Almost all the population of Olosega now reside in Olosega village along the southwestern-facing shore. Olosega also has Olosega Elementary School with instruction through grade 8 for children on both islands.

References

Villages in American Samoa